A Rock in the Weary Land is the seventh studio album by The Waterboys, released in 2000 by BMG International. It was their first album after a seven-year break, but mostly continues the hard rock vein of the previous album Dream Harder (1993). The album cover photography is by Steve Gullick.

Recording sessions for the album began in early 1999. It was the first album Scott had recorded without the backing of a record label. Once it was completed, Scott's manager, Philip Tennant, negotiated a deal with BMG and Scott decided to have the album, originally a solo project, released under the Waterboys' name. He recruited some of the musicians who had played on A Rock in the Weary Land as official band members for an upcoming UK tour. The album marked the return of old collaborator Anthony Thistlethwaite after a decade.

Reception

Critic John Mulvey, writing for NME, described the album as "largely excellent" except for "We Are Jonah", which he describes as "appallingly cheery Christian rock". Dave Sleger of AllMusic considered the album to be "ambitious, moody, surreal, and relevant" and one which "incorporates all of the elements and possibilities of modern rock into a uniform, technically updated body of work".

Track listing
All songs written by Mike Scott, unless otherwise noted.

 "Let It Happen" – 6:20
 "My Love Is My Rock in the Weary Land" – 8:16
 "It's All Gone" – 2:15
 "Is She Conscious?" – 4:41
 "We Are Jonah" – 5:08
 "Malediction" – 4:16
 "Dumbing Down the World" – 3:06
 "His Word Is Not His Bond" – 3:59
 "Night Falls on London" – 0:48
 "The Charlatan's Lament" – 6:52
 "The Wind in the Wires" – 5:33
 "Crown" – 7:04

Extra tracks release
A North American version of the album with two extra tracks was released August 21, 2001.

 "Let It Happen" – 6:20
 "The Charlatan's Lament" – 6:52
 "Is She Conscious?" – 4:41
 "We Are Jonah" – 5:08
 "It's All Gone" – 2:15
 "My Love Is My Rock in the Weary Land" – 8:05
 "Lucky Day/Bad Advice" (Bill Grant, Scott) – 3:06
 "His Word Is Not His Bond" – 3:59
 "Malediction" – 4:16
 "Dumbing Down the World" – 3:06
 "The Wind in the Wires" – 5:33
 "Night Falls on London" – 0:48
 "Crown" – 7:04
 "My Lord What a Morning" (Harry Belafonte, Gene Cormun, Milt Okun) – 2:27

"My Love is My Rock in the Weary Land" on the American edition is edited compared to the UK edition, playing at a slower speed and featuring numerous differences in the outro.

"Lucky Day/Bad Advice" features a co-writing credit with Bill Grant, whom Scott befriended while living at Findhorn. According to Scott, "Who could make this day again?" was one of Grant's favourite phrases.

Japanese editions
The standard Japanese release of the album contains the songs "Time, Space and the Bride's Bed", "Trouble Down Yonder" and "Send Him Down to Waco", but not "My Lord What a Morning".

A limited two-disc edition was also issued in Japan by BMG International. The track list of the first disc is identical to the standard track list, above. The track list of the second disc, which is entitled "The Weary Land EP", is as follows:

 "Lucky Day/Bad Advice" (Grant, Scott) – 3:14
 "Time, Space, and the Bride's Bed" – 5:38
 "Trouble Down Yonder" (Anonymous) – 1:05
 "Send Him Down to Waco" – 7:34

Singles
Prior to the album's release, BMG issued a six-track EP containing the single "Is She Conscious?". The single also contained a video for the song.

 "Is She Conscious?" – 4:51
 "Sad Procession" – 7:22
 "The Faeries' Prisoner" – 2:10
 "Is She Conscious?" (Acoustic) – 4:31
 "Savage Earth Heart" (Sound-Desk Recording) – 16:01
 "My Lord, What A Morning" (Belafonte, Corman, Okun) – 2:27

BMG also issued and almost immediately recalled two singles each (separately packaged) for "My Love is My Rock in the Weary Land" and "We Are Jonah". These are considered collector's items by some Waterboys fans and command high resale prices.

Personnel
Mike Scott – vocals, acoustic guitar, electric guitar, Danelectro Bellzouki electric 12-string guitar, piano, organ, synthesizer 
Gilad Atzmon – saxophone
Paul Beavis – drums
Livingston Brown - bass guitar
Jody Linscott – drums
The London Community Gospel Choir
Cameron Miller – bass guitar
Richard Naiff – piano
Claire Nicholson - background vocals
Dave Ruffy – tambourine, drum programming
Robin Scott – background vocals
Mark Smith – bass guitar
Jeremy Stacey – drums
Rowan Stigner – drum programming
Chris Taggart - drums
Thighpaulsandra – synthesizer, trumpet, keyboards, mellotron
Anthony Thistlethwaite – mandolin, slide mandolin
Kevin Wilkinson – drums

Charts

References

External links
Lyrics to the first half of A Rock in the Weary Land at the official Waterboys webpage
Lyrics to the second half of A Rock in the Weary Land at the official Waterboys webpage
Official forum Chord requests are often fulfilled at "Musician's Corner"

The Waterboys albums
2000 albums
2001 albums